The NVI F.K.33 was an airliner built in the Netherlands in 1925 for use by KLM for night flying.

Design and development
The F.K.33 was a largely conventional high-wing, strut-braced monoplane with seating for ten passengers in an enclosed cabin. A trimotor design, the placement of its engines was unusual. While two engines were mounted among the struts that braced the wings and the main units of the undercarriage, the third engine was mounted pusher-fashion on a set of struts above the wing. The engine installation was further unorthodox in that none of the three engines were enclosed in nacelles, remaining instead fully exposed.

Operational history
KLM successfully operated the type for two years on its Amsterdam-London-Paris-Malmö route, but doing an increasing amount of business with Fokker, did not purchase further aircraft from NVI. The F.K.33 was eventually sold to German airline Aero, but after two accidents within months of purchasing it, they returned it claiming poor workmanship. It was sold again in 1928, to Baumer-Aero, who replaced the Armstrong-Siddeley engines with Junkers L5s and the boarding lights with loudspeakers. In this configuration, it was flown as an advertising machine until 1931. The F.K.33 ended its days requisitioned by the Luftwaffe in 1939 as an instructional airframe.

Specifications

References

 
 
 
 Koolhoven Aeroplanes Foundation
 Уголок неба

F.K.33
1920s Dutch airliners
Three-engined push-pull aircraft
High-wing aircraft
Aircraft first flown in 1925